Marko Veselica (January 9, 1936 – February 17, 2017 in Zagreb) was a Croatian politician, economist and university professor.

During the Croatian Spring, Marko Veselica developed a reputation of being a Croatian nationalist. He was close to Ivan Milas. As a prominent Croatian dissident his Croatian nationalist views brought him into conflict with the Communist authorities of Yugoslavia.  In 1981 he was arrested on suspicion of "antistate activities", charged with spreading hostile propaganda in interviews with Western news organizations and maintaining contacts with emigre groups, and after a seven-day trial sentenced by a Zagreb court to eleven years imprisonment.  In 1983 he was an Amnesty International prisoner of conscience.

In 1990, he became leader of the newly formed Croatian Democratic Party (HDS).  Following the merger of the HDS and the Croatian Christian Democratic Party (HKDS) he became chairman (1992–2001) of the Croatian Christian Democratic Union HKDU.

He died on 17 February 2017 at morning in Fran Mihaljević hospital in Zagreb.

References

1936 births
2017 deaths
People from Sinj
Amnesty International prisoners of conscience held by Yugoslavia
Croatian Christian Democratic Party politicians
Croatian Democratic Party politicians
Candidates in the 1992 Croatian presidential election
Faculty of Economics and Business, University of Zagreb alumni
Representatives in the modern Croatian Parliament
Academic staff of the University of Zagreb
Croatian Christian Democratic Union politicians
Croatian nationalists
Yugoslav prisoners and detainees
Croatian prisoners and detainees